The 1989 Big Eight men's basketball tournament was held March 10–12 at Kemper Arena in Kansas City, Missouri.

Second-seeded Missouri defeated #1 seed Oklahoma in the championship game, 98–86, to earn the conference's automatic bid to the 1989 NCAA tournament.

Bracket

References

Tournament
Big Eight Conference men's basketball tournament
Big Eight Conference men's basketball tournament
Big Eight Conference men's basketball tournament